Wild Dances is the fifth studio album by Ukrainian singer-songwriter Ruslana. It was released on July 6, 2004. The album has been certified 7x platinum in Ukraine, selling 700,000 copies and Platinum in Slovakia.

Track listing
Basic album

Wild Dances (New Year/Christmas Edition) (21 February 2005)
The album is the 2005 English version of Wild Dances. The Christmas Edition has festive design, bonus tracks and includes a poster with a calendar for the year 2006.
 Wild Dances (Victory Dance) – 3:00
 Dance with the Wolves (Extreme Dance) – 3:57
 Accordion Intro (Ethno Dance) – 1:00
 The Same Star (Night Dance) – 4:19
 Play, Musician (Joy Dance) – 3:53
 Like a Hurricane (Drive Dance) – 2:36
 Tango We Used to Dance (Love Dance) – 3:45
 Wild Dances [Part 2] (Sympho Dance) – 3:59
 Wild Passion (Molfar Dance) – 4:00
 Wild Dances [Harem's Percussion Mix] (Thanks to Turkey) – 2:52
 Ring Dance with the Wolves [Bonus track] – 3:51
 Wild Dances [C.Y.T. vs DJ Nick 2005 (Club Edit)] [Bonus track] – 4:10
 The Same Star [DJ Small & LV Club Mix] [Bonus track] – 6:45

Personnel
 Vadim Chislov – Assistant Engineer
 Goatboy – Producer
 Harem – Percussion
 Marco Migliari – Mixing
 Andrei Petrov – Photography
 Ruslana — Arranger, Vocals (background), producer, engineer, Mixing
 Ryan Smith – Mastering

Charts

Certifications and sales

Notes

Ruslana albums
2004 albums